FRACS may refer to :

 Royal Australasian College of Surgeons the leading advocate for surgical standards ;
 France Aviation Civile Services, a Groupement d'intérêt économique.